Hadi Saei (born June 10, 1976) is an Iranian councilor and former taekwondo athlete who became the most successful Iranian athlete in Olympic history and the most titled champion in this sport by winning 9 world class titles (two olympic titles in 2004 and 2008, two world championships titles, four world cup titles and one world olympic qualification tournament).
Earlier in his career and in the 2000 Summer Olympics in Sydney, Saei had won the Bronze medal. He was elected as member of City Council of Tehran in 2006 local elections and was reelected in 2013 but lost the 2017 election. He is one of the three most medal winners olympians in the sport of Taekwondo.

Career
He has been practicing Taekwondo since he was six years old. 
Having previously competed in Lightweight (67–72 kg), he is the 1999 World Champion and 2003 World Championship silver medalist. When the Iranian town of Bam was devastated in the 2003 earthquake, Saei put his medals on auction to raise money for the victims.

He has been World Champion in the Tae Kwon Do World Championships two times. Currently, he is a senior at the Iran Physical Education University.

Saei officially ended his career as a Tae Kwon Do athlete on November 8, 2008 (18 Aban 1387).

2008 Summer Olympics
In the first match against the Nepalese Deepak Bista his right hand was fractured during the fight however he did not indicate his injury throughout the entire competition despite enormous pain until he won the final against the Italian Mauro Sarmiento. Immediately after winning the Gold medal his hand was in plaster cast. Previously he wanted to say farewell after winning in the final, but his coach Reza Mehmandoust has advised him not to do it.

By winning his gold medal, Saei ensured that  Iran was leaving Beijing with a better result than their poor showing at the 1948 Summer Olympics in London, where they received only one bronze medal. Full results of Iran's medals in the history of the Summer Olympic games can be found in the 'Medal tables' in Iran at the Olympics.

Titles
1995 World Military Taekwondo Championships SILVER
1996 World Military Taekwondo Championships BRONZE
1998 World Taekwondo Cup GOLD
1999 World Taekwondo Championships GOLD
2000 World Taekwondo Cup GOLD
2000 Sydney Olympic Games BRONZE
2001 World Taekwondo Cup GOLD
2002 Asian Taekwondo Championships SILVER
2002 World Taekwondo Cup GOLD
2002 Busan Asian Games GOLD
2003 World Taekwondo Championships SILVER
2004 Asian Olympic Qualification Tournament GOLD
2004 Athens Olympic Games GOLD
2005 World Taekwondo Championship GOLD
2006 Asian Taekwondo Championships GOLD
2006 Doha Asian Games BRONZE
2007 World Taekwondo Championship BRONZE
2008 Asian Olympic Qualification Tournament GOLD
2008 Beijing Olympic Games GOLD

In popular culture
Hadi Saei starred in the TV series Amin directed by Manuchehr Hadi in 2015.

Personal life
He has suffered great personal tragedy having lost his brother and father in the same year, in addition to his younger brother who succumbed to cancer the following year. Saei is originally Iranian Azerbaijani from the East Azerbaijan Province and Bostanabad city.

See also
2006 Iranian City and Village Councils elections

References

  Biography

External links

 
 
 
 World Tae Kwon Do Online Magazine 
 Tae Kwon Do players (Tae Kwon Do fan site)
 Tae Kwon Do Club / Kauno Taekwondo Klubas
 
 

Iranian male taekwondo practitioners
Olympic taekwondo practitioners of Iran
Taekwondo practitioners at the 2000 Summer Olympics
Taekwondo practitioners at the 2004 Summer Olympics
Taekwondo practitioners at the 2008 Summer Olympics
Olympic gold medalists for Iran
Olympic bronze medalists for Iran
Sportspeople from Tehran
1976 births
Living people
Asian Games gold medalists for Iran
Asian Games bronze medalists for Iran
Asian Games medalists in taekwondo
Olympic medalists in taekwondo
Taekwondo practitioners at the 1998 Asian Games
Taekwondo practitioners at the 2002 Asian Games
Taekwondo practitioners at the 2006 Asian Games
Iranian sportsperson-politicians
Medalists at the 2008 Summer Olympics
Medalists at the 2004 Summer Olympics
Iranian Azerbaijanis
Medalists at the 2000 Summer Olympics
Medalists at the 2002 Asian Games
Medalists at the 2006 Asian Games
Tehran Councillors 2013–2017
Tehran Councillors 2007–2013
Recipients of the Order of Courage (Iran)
World Taekwondo Championships medalists
Asian Taekwondo Championships medalists